Afterthought (translit. Hayored lema'ala) is a 2015 Israeli philosophical comedy film written and directed by Elad Keidan. It was screened in the Special Screenings section at the 2015 Cannes Film Festival. It has been nominated for Best Film at the 2015 Ophir Awards. The film has won 3 Ophir prizes: best script, best editing, and best sound design. The film was awarded best film at the Haifa film festival.

Cast
 Itay Tiran as Uri
 Uri Klauzner as Moshe
 Michaela Eshet as Na'va
 Ohad Shahar as Saul

References

External links
 

2015 films
2015 comedy films
2010s Hebrew-language films
Films set in Israel
Existentialist films
Israeli comedy films